Norsk Elektrisk & Brown Boveri A/S also known as NEBB was a Norwegian manufacturing company, which built a lot of the rolling stock that is used by Norges Statsbaner. The plant was located at Skøyen. In 1988 it merged into Asea Brown Boveri (ABB).

History
Frognerkilens Fabrikk was founded in 1874 with focus on agricultural machinery. In 1881 it started production of the first electric motor and in 1894 it changed its name to Norsk Elektrisk A/S. Cooperation with Brown, Boveri & Cie (BBC) started in 1905 and in 1908 BBC bought the company, giving it the name NEBB. In 1948 NEBB acquired Skabo Jernbanevognfabrikk that made railway wagons, merging the two companies, though Skabo is closed and sold to Strømmens Værksted in 1973. In 1979 Strømmens Værksted was bought by NEBB. In 1988 BBC merged with ASEA to found Asea Brown Boveri (ABB) and NEBB was merged into the new corporation, losing its former own identity. Today NEBB is part of Bombardier Transportation.

Production
NEBB has been an important producer of rolling stock for the Norwegian State Railways (NSB), including the following models:
 NSB El 4 locomotive
 NSB El 5 locomotive
 NSB El 8 locomotive
 NSB El 9 locomotive
 NSB El 14 locomotive
 NSB BM65 multiple unit

References

Defunct manufacturing companies of Norway
Locomotive manufacturers of Norway
Rolling stock manufacturers of Norway
Companies based in Oslo
Manufacturing companies established in 1874
ABB
Bombardier Transportation
Norwegian companies established in 1874